Cora leslactuca is a species of basidiolichen in the family Hygrophoraceae. It was formally described as a new species in 2016 by Robert Lücking, Bibiana Moncada, and Rouchi Nadine Peláez-Pulido. The specific epithet leslactuca combines the second syllable of David Leslie Hawksworth's middle name with the genus name Lactuca, thereby both alluding to the resemblance of the thallus to lettuce leaves and honouring the British mycologist. The lichen is known only from its type locality in the Bosques Peña de Santa Bárbara Natural Reserve (Junín, Cundinamarca).

References

leslactuca
Lichen species
Lichens described in 2016
Lichens of Colombia
Taxa named by Robert Lücking
Basidiolichens